Webster and Stevens was a photographic studio partnership between Ira Webster and Nelson Stevens. They moved from Michigan to Seattle in 1899 and after working for local photography studios for several years, they opened a studio in 1902 and photographed Seattle and the Puget Sound region. They helped pioneer the area's commercial and photojournalism fields. Their marketing motto was "Anything. Anytime. Anywhere." Their studio produced more than 60,000 black-and-white photographs of Seattle and the Pacific Northwest. They had a contract as photographers for the Seattle Times from 1906 until 1923.

Webster & Stevens reprinted work by other studios and developed a photo library they marketed to newspapers and magazines

Gallery

References

Art duos
20th-century American photographers